Blindfolded Eyes is a 1978 Spanish drama film directed by Carlos Saura. It was entered into the 1978 Cannes Film Festival.

Plot
Luis (Gómez) is a drama teacher producing a play about repression and torture, he even develops a relationship with the play's leading actress (Chaplin). However as the play continues to develop, Luis receives threatening letters demanding that he abandon the play.

Cast
 Geraldine Chaplin as Emilia
 José Luis Gómez as Luis
 Xabier Elorriaga as Manuel
 Lola Cardona as La tía
 André Falcon as Abogado
 Manuel Guitián as El tío
 Carmen Maura as La enfermera
 Fabienae Molière
 Judith Cuquele Tarasiuk
 Dominique Lestournel

References

External links

1978 films
1970s Spanish-language films
1978 drama films
Films directed by Carlos Saura
Spanish drama films
1970s Spanish films